Anarsia permissa is a moth of the family Gelechiidae. It was described by Edward Meyrick in 1926. It is found in Namibia.

References

permissa
Moths described in 1926
Moths of Africa